Giulia Rambaldi Guidasci (born 11 November 1986 in Milan) was an Italian female former water polo player. She was part of the Italy women's national water polo team at the 2012 Summer Olympics.

She also competed at the 2011 World Aquatics Championships.

References

External links
http://www.rtve.es/londres-2012/giulia-rambaldi-guidasci/1064419
https://www.swimmingworldmagazine.com/news/fina-world-championships-water-polo-china-greece-move-into-gold-medal-match/
http://bogliascobene.com/tag/si-e-laureata-giulia-rambaldi-guidasci/
http://www.gettyimages.ca/photos/giulia-rambaldi?excludenudity=true&sort=mostpopular&mediatype=photography&phrase=giulia%20rambaldi
http://www.zimbio.com/photos/Giulia+Rambaldi-Guidasci/Women+Water+Polo+Day+Fourteen+14th+FINA+World/V2GTBtgQZJA

1986 births
Living people
Italian female water polo players
Olympic water polo players of Italy
Water polo players at the 2012 Summer Olympics
Sportspeople from Milan
21st-century Italian women